Lionel Bomayako (born September 15, 1978) is a Central African Republic-French basketball player. He is also a member of the Central African Republic national basketball team.

Career

University
Bomayako was born in Bangui, Central African Empire and played NCAA Division I basketball at Fairleigh Dickinson University.  Bomayako's best season was his senior year in which he averaged 12.4 PPG and 2.4 RPG for the Knights.

Club
Bomayako has played professional basketball for seven different teams in France, Sweden, and Switzerland in the six years following his 2003 graduation. In his most recent season, 2008–09, he played seven games coming off the bench for Quimper UJAC in France.

International
Bomayako is also a long-time member of the Central African Republic national basketball team.  He participated in the 2005, 2007, and 2009 African Championships, helping the Central African Republic to three consecutive quarterfinal appearances.

References

1978 births
Living people
BC Orchies players
Besançon BCD players
Central African Republic men's basketball players
Fairleigh Dickinson Knights men's basketball players
French men's basketball players
Nanterre 92 players
People from Bangui
Point guards
Shooting guards